Summon the Thunder is the second novel in the Star Trek: Vanguard series revolving around the Federation Starbase 47, otherwise known as Vanguard.

Synopsis
The Shedai, an ancient race of beings, threaten the lives of all aboard Vanguard.

External links

#2: Summon the Thunder at Psi Phi
Author's Annotations

2006 American novels
Star Trek: Vanguard novels
2006 science fiction novels